The NYNEX Commemorative was a golf tournament on the Champions Tour from 1982 to 1993. It was played in Newport, Rhode Island at the Newport Country Club (1982–1985) and in Scarborough, New York at the Sleepy Hollow Country Club (1986–1993).

The purse for the 1993 tournament was US$550,000, with $82,500 going to the winner. The tournament was founded in 1982 as the Merrill Lynch/Golf Digest Commemorative Pro-Am.

Winners
NYNEX Commemorative
1993 Bob Wynn
1992 Dale Douglass
1991 Charles Coody
1990 Lee Trevino

NYNEX/Golf Digest Commemorative
1989 Bob Charles
1988 Bob Charles
1987 Gene Littler

Merrill Lynch/Golf Digest Commemorative
1986 Lee Elder

Merrill Lynch/Golf Digest Commemorative Pro-Am
1985 Lee Elder
1984 Roberto De Vicenzo
1983 Miller Barber
1982 Billy Casper
1981 Doug Ford (unofficial event)

Source:

References

Former PGA Tour Champions events
Golf in New York (state)
Golf in Rhode Island
Recurring sporting events established in 1982
Recurring sporting events disestablished in 1993
1982 establishments in Rhode Island
1993 disestablishments in New York (state)